Richard Rubin (born 1967) is an American writer. He has published essays, articles, and short stories in a number of newspapers and magazines. He is perhaps best known as the author of The Last of the Doughboys: The Forgotten Generation and Their Forgotten World War, a history of America and World War I based upon interviews he conducted with its last veterans, and Confederacy of Silence: A True Tale of the New Old South, a personal memoir about the year he spent living and working as a newspaper reporter in the rural Mississippi Delta. He is also known for his many short pieces, including "The Ghosts of Emmett Till," an acclaimed article he published in The New York Times Magazine in 2005, in which he revisits interviews he conducted in 1995 with the two surviving defense attorneys and the two surviving jurors from the 1955 Sumner, Mississippi, trial of Roy Bryant and J.W. Milam, white men who were ultimately acquitted of the murder of the black 14-year old Emmett Till, despite overwhelming evidence of their guilt. Bryant and Milam later confessed to the murder in an interview with journalist William Bradford Huie for Look Magazine. "The Ghosts of Emmett Till" was anthologized in The Best American Crime Writing 2006. In 2014, Rubin wrote a series of pieces for The New York Times, for which he visited various American World War I battlefields in France. The series, titled "Over There," was published in four installments between August and December, 2014; the final installment, titled "In France, Vestiges of the Great War's Bloody End," which deals with the Meuse-Argonne, was for a time the most emailed article in the newspaper.

Biography

Early life and education
Rubin was born in Manhattan and raised in Westchester County, New York. He attended the University of Pennsylvania, where he majored in history, graduating with honors in 1988. In 1991, he received a Master's in Creative Writing from Boston University, where he studied under Leslie Epstein.

Career
Rubin published his first short story, "November," in the Oxford American in 1995. That same year, he published the first of several pieces in the "Talk of the Town" section of The New Yorker, including one about sledding down West End Avenue during the Blizzard of 1996. In July, 1996 he published his first essay in the Atlantic Monthly, "Welcome to Our Tomb," a meditation on Grant's Tomb and the unexpected things visitors write in the guest register there. The piece was republished in condensed form in Reader's Digest that December, under the title "What's Written in Grant's Tomb." Rubin would go on to write publish more than a dozen pieces in the Atlantic, most of them dealing with historical subjects or things that are about to disappear. One notable exception is "It's Radi-O!", a meditation on the significance of that medium. One Atlantic piece, "The Colfax Riot," appeared in the magazine's July/August 2003 issue and is said to have been the inspiration for journalist Charles Lane's book on the same subject, "The Day Freedom Died."

Rubin has published pieces in numerous publications, including The New York Times magazine, New York magazine, Smithsonian, PARADE, and a series of essays for AARP magazine. In 2007, he was an Op-Ed Contributor to The New York Times with his Veteran's Day piece "Over There — and Gone Forever," about the last surviving American World War I veteran; the Times named it one of a handful of Notable Op-Eds for that year. From 2008 to 2010, he was the Viebranz Visiting Professor of Creative Writing at St. Lawrence University in Canton, New York.

Personal life
Rubin lives in Maine.

Notable works

Confederacy of Silence: A True Tale of the New Old South 

Publication
Confederacy of Silence: A True Tale of the New Old South is a book by Richard Rubin. A true story and national bestseller, it was first published in 2002 by Atria, Simon & Schuster.  The book is 448 pages long and available in hardcover, softcover, and eBook.  .

Synopsis
When Richard Rubin, fresh out of the Ivy League, accepts a job at a daily newspaper in the old Delta town of Greenwood, Mississippi, he is thrust into a place as different from his hometown of New York as any in the country. Yet to his surprise, he is warmly welcomed by the townspeople and soon finds his first great scoop in Handy Campbell, a poor, black teen and gifted high school quarterback who goes on to win a spot on Mississippi State's team — a training ground for the NFL.

Six years later, Rubin, back in New York, learns that Campbell is locked up in Greenwood, accused of capital murder. Returning south to cover the trial, Rubin follows the trail that took Handy from the football field to county jail. As the best and worst elements of Mississippi rise up to do battle over one man's fate, Rubin must confront his own unresolved feelings about the confederacy of silence that initially enabled him to thrive in Greenwood but ultimately forced him to leave it.

The Last of the Doughboys 
The Last of the Doughboys is a conversational history of America's experience in World War I as recalled by its last surviving veterans, published by Houghton Mifflin in 2013. . Rubin tracked down and interviewed dozens of surviving American World War I veterans for the book. He recorded these interviews on video.

Selected works
 
 Confederacy of Silence: A True Tale of the New Old South (2002)
 The Last of the Doughboys (2013)
 Back Over There: One American Time-Traveler, 100 Years Since the Great War, 500 Miles of Battle-Scarred French Countryside, and Too Many Trenches, Shells, Legends and Ghosts to Count (2017)

Notes

External links
 Author's website
  Rubin's Lecture on The Last of the Doughboys at the Pritzker Military Museum & Library on June 13, 2013
   NPR Interview with Richard Rubin on The Last of the Doughboys
 
 Richard Rubin talks about his book "Back Over There"

1967 births
Living people
American essayists
American memoirists
American short story writers
The Atlantic (magazine) people
Boston University College of Arts and Sciences alumni
University of Pennsylvania alumni
Writers from New York City